Maxar Technologies Inc. is a space technology company headquartered in Westminster, Colorado, United States, specializing in manufacturing communication, Earth observation, radar, and on-orbit servicing satellites, satellite products, and related services. DigitalGlobe and MDA Holdings Company merged to become Maxar Technologies on October 5, 2017. Maxar Technologies is the parent holding company of Space Systems Loral, headquartered in Palo Alto, California, US; DigitalGlobe, headquartered in Westminster, Colorado, US; and Radiant Solutions, headquartered in Herndon, Virginia, US. Maxar Technologies is dual-listed on the Toronto Stock Exchange and New York Stock Exchange as MAXR.

In May 2019, the company was selected as the provider of the power and propulsion element for the Lunar Gateway developed by NASA.

On December 30, 2019, the company announced that it had entered into a definitive agreement to sell MDA's assets to a consortium of financial sponsors led by Northern Private Capital for CAD$1 billion (US$765 million). The sale includes all of MDA's Canadian businesses, encompassing ground stations, radar satellite products, robotics, defense, and satellite components, representing approximately 1,900 employees. On April 8, 2020, the sale of MDA to NPC officially closed. The newly formed privately held Canadian company was named MDA Ltd., which later listed on the Toronto Stock Exchange.

On December 16, 2022, Maxar announced it will be acquired by private equity firm Advent International, in an all-cash transaction worth $6.4 billion.

Business 
Maxar Technologies is the combined operations of Vricon, DigitalGlobe, Radiant Solutions and SSL (Space Systems/Loral).

 Vricon, a subsidiary that provides 3D geospatial analytics through satellite data
 DigitalGlobe, a vendor and producer of high resolution satellite imagery
 Radiant Solutions, a subsidiary that provides data modeling; and analytics for satellite data
 SSL, a subsidiary that constructs satellites

History 
Maxar Technologies was created in 2017 from the combination of MacDonald, Dettwiler and Associates (MDA) and DigitalGlobe, with the resulting company renamed Maxar. The headquarters of the combined entity was then established in Westminster, Colorado. The company was dual-listed on the TSX and NYSE.

In Q3 2018 Maxar's revenue and adjusted profit missed estimates due to a decline in its satellite manufacturing segment oriented towards geosynchronous earth orbit communications, which led to a plunge in the stock price. The situation was compounded in January 2019 with the loss of their relatively new WorldView-4 satellite, and the market capitalization fell from $3 to $0.3 billion in half a year, and with an insurance payment only covering a fifth of WV-4 total launch cost the company had to restructure its debts in April 2019.

In 2020, Maxar divested itself of the Canadian MDA portion, returning MDA to a separate operating company.

In 2022, Maxar published several satellite images that showed a Russian military convoy during its invasion of Ukraine.

Timeline

 1969: John MacDonald and Vern Dettwiler founded MacDonald, Dettwiler and Associates.
 1993: MDA sells its Electro-Optical Division (EOP) based in Richmond Canada to a Swiss Private Equity firm which merges with Cymbolic Sciences based in California.
 1995: MDA was acquired by Orbital Sciences for $67 million in stock
 1996: acquired Iotek, a supplier of signal processing and sonar technology for military customers, for undisclosed sum
 2000: entered joint venture with LandAmerica Financial Group to create LandMDA, a provider of property reports to lenders
 2000/01: Orbital Sciences divested its MDA shares through an initial public offering; trades as 
 2002: acquired Automated Mining Systems of Aurora, Ontario for $225,000
 2002: acquired Dynacs for $3.1 million, with an additional $6.8 million contingent on performance (now "MDA US Systems, LLC", located in Houston, Texas)
 2003: acquired Millar & Bryce, a commercial provider of land information in Scotland, for $21.32 million, with $1.76 million contingent on performance.
 2004: acquired Marshall & Swift / Boeckh for $337.8 million, with $104.9 million contingent on performance.
 2005: acquired business of EMS Technologies Canada (previously RCA Canada, which then became the Montreal division of SPAR Aerospace), a major supplier and subcontractor, for $8.9 million
 2006: expanded into financial services with acquisition of Mindbox, a supplier of advanced decision systems for mortgage lending, for US$12.6 million, with up to $10.75 million contingent on performance
 2006: acquired xit2 Ltd. (Nr Charlbury, Oxfordshire, UK), information exchange solutions for lenders and home surveyors and other outsourced service providers
 2006: acquired Lyttle & Co. (Belfast, Northern Ireland), property and related search information
 2007: acquired Alliance Spacesystems, Inc. (now "Maxar Space Robotics LLC", located in Pasadena, CA, US)
 2008: MDA announced the sale of its Information Systems and Geospacial Services operations to Alliant Techsystems of Edina, Minnesota for $1.325 billion. However, amongst much media coverage, the sale was rejected by the federal government of Canada under the Investment Canada Act.
 2008: Canadian government officially blocked the sale of MDA to ATK on May 8, 2008
 2012: acquired Space Systems/Loral for US$875 million, making MDA one of the world's leading communication satellite companies.
 2014: acquired the Advanced Systems business line (formerly ERIM International) of General Dynamics Advanced Information Systems division.
 2017: Completed its acquisition of DigitalGlobe, MDA now will be named Maxar Technologies, dual-listed on NYSE and TSX.  MDA will then be a subsidiary of US-based Maxar by 2019.
 2018: Announced acquisition of Neptec for $32 million.
 2019: Completed U.S. domestication, whereby the parent company is now incorporated in the U.S. state of Delaware
 2020: MDA is sold to a consortium of Canadian investors led by Northern Private Capital. This sale includes the Houston-based MDA US Systems, LLC.
 2020: Completed its acquisition of Vricon, Inc for $140 million. Vricon is a global leader in satellite-derived 3D data for defense and intelligence markets 
 2022: Maxar to be taken private through an acquisition led by Advent International, in a cash deal worth $6.4 billion.

See also 
 Bombardier Aerospace
 COM DEV International
 CMC Electronics
 Héroux-Devtek
 MDA Space Missions
 Spar Aerospace
 Viking Air

References

External links

1969 establishments in British Columbia
Aerospace companies of Canada
Aerospace companies of the United States
Companies based in Jefferson County, Colorado
Companies listed on the New York Stock Exchange
Companies listed on the Toronto Stock Exchange
Manufacturing companies based in Colorado
Manufacturing companies established in 1969
Private spaceflight companies
Space industry companies of Canada
Spacecraft manufacturers
Technology companies established in 1969
Westminster, Colorado
Announced mergers and acquisitions